White Fox is a village in the Canadian province of Saskatchewan within the Rural Municipality of Torch River No. 488 and Census Division No. 14. It is on Highway 55 near the White Fox River and nearly 14 km northwest of the Town of Nipawin. White Fox has a community hall for use by local residents, a public library, post office, a skating and curling facility, and a campground/RV park.

History 
White Fox incorporated as a village on July 21, 1941.

Demographics 

References 

Villages in Saskatchewan
Torch River No. 488, Saskatchewan
Division No. 14, Saskatchewan